Richard of Normandy (died c. 1070) was the second son of William the Conqueror, King of England, and Matilda of Flanders.

Richard died in a hunting accident in the New Forest in a collision with an overhanging branch, probably in 1070 or shortly afterwards. He was buried at Winchester Cathedral. His younger brother, King William Rufus, was also killed in the New Forest in 1100.

Richard is sometimes referred to as the "Duke of Bernay", as if part of his father's continental possessions, as in Burke's Peerage; this is a mistake based on the misinterpretation of a 16th-century inscription on his tomb, which was also intended for the Earl Beorn, nephew of Cnut the Great.

Notes

1050s births
1070s deaths
Year of birth uncertain
Year of death uncertain
11th-century English people
House of Normandy
Burials at Winchester Cathedral
Children of William the Conqueror
Anglo-Normans
Sons of kings